Clotworthy John Eyre Skeffington, 11th Viscount Massereene (9 October 1842 – 26 June 1905) was an Anglo-Irish peer. 

He was the son of John Skeffington, 10th Viscount Massereene and Olivia Grady. He inherited his father's titles in the Peerage of Ireland in 1863. He served as Lord Lieutenant of Louth between 13 November 1879 and March 1898. He served in the Antrim Militia Artillery at Carrickfergus Castle, which had been commanded by his father, and was promoted to Lieutenant-Colonel Commandant himself on 20 November 1872.

He married Florence Elizabeth Whyte-Melville on 4 October 1870. He was succeeded in his titles by his second son, Algernon Skeffington, as his eldest son, Oriel, had died in April 1905.

References

1842 births
1905 deaths
19th-century Anglo-Irish people
Lord-Lieutenants of Louth
Viscounts in the Peerage of Ireland